Frink or frinks may refer to:

Places
 Frink, Florida, an unincorporated community
 Frink Park, a park in Seattle, Washington
 Mount Frink, Vancouver Island, British Columbia, Canada

People
 Frink (surname)
 Golden Frinks (1920–2004), African-American civil rights activist

Arts, entertainment, and media

Fictional characters
 Frank Frink, a fictional character in The Man in the High Castle television series, whose family name was originally "Fink"
 Professor Frink, a fictional character in The Simpsons

Other uses
 Frink (programming language), named after Professor Frink (The Simpsons)
 Frink ideal, in mathematics, a certain kind of subset of a partially ordered set
 Frink Medal, an award for British zoologists